Macarena Miranda (born 29 July 1971) is a Chilean former professional tennis player.

Miranda played on the professional tour from 1986 to 1992, reaching career-high rankings of 325 in singles and 187 in doubles. During this time, she was a regular member of the Chile Federation Cup team. Her best performance on the WTA Tour was a semifinal appearance in the doubles at Guaruja in 1988. Retiring in 1992, she made a comeback in 2002 to play a further five Fed Cup ties for Chile, bringing her final tally to 14.

ITF finals

Singles: 6 (1–5)

Doubles: 11 (4–7)

References

External links
 
 
 

1971 births
Living people
Chilean female tennis players
South American Games medalists in tennis
South American Games bronze medalists for Chile
Competitors at the 1986 South American Games
Tennis players at the 1991 Pan American Games
Pan American Games competitors for Chile
20th-century Chilean women
21st-century Chilean women